Carl Maria Seyppel, also Karl Maria Seyppel, (28 July 1847 – 20 November 1913) was a German genre and portrait painter, caricaturist, and writer, based in Düsseldorf.

Life 
Seyppel was born in Düsseldorf, the son of Friedrich Wilhelm Seyppel, an official of the Düsseldorf Städtische Leihanstalt, and his wife Josefina Dorothea, née Tasse, He entered the Kunstakademie Düsseldorf already at the age of 14, through the mediation of Hermann Wislicenus. His teachers there were Andreas Müller in basics and art history, Carl Müller in the hall of antiquities (Antikensaal) and Rudolf Wiegmann in the building class. In November 1866, he moved to the compositional class headed by Karl Ferdinand Sohn. The painting Junger Italiener (Young Italian), created in 1867 in the master class, is considered his first independent work. Also while still a student, he created Der glückliche Fund (The lucky find) 1868. After Sohn's death, Seyppel continued his studies with Julius Roeting and Eduard Bendemann. His exposure to Dutch Golden Age painting provided him with a thorough technique as well as a fine sense of tone. In 1870, he worked for a short time in the studio of Ludwig Knaus. After an assignment during the Franco-Prussian War of 1870/71 as a nurse in hospitals near Trier and Metz, he undertook study trips to Rhine and Moselle, to Westphalia and Upper Bavaria, to the Black Forest and to England and the Netherlands.

Seyppel's works were regularly exhibited at home and abroad. The Kulturhistorisches Museum Magdeburg purchased the painting In zwei Zügen matt in 1887, which he then repeated in 1889.

Seyppel was active in Düsseldorf throughout his life. He was a member of the association Malkasten (KVM) from 1873 to 1913, serving as its president from 1998. He was also a member of the academic artists association Orient, and involved on the board of the Düsseldorf Historical Society. Seyppel painted landscapes including Straße an der Mosel (1870), Mühle am Niederrhein (1872), Windmühle bei Zons (1870), and also portraits, especially those of fellow Düsseldorf painters, but he preferred humorous scenes from folk life. For a restaurant he created the mural Die Wolfsschlucht. His "Ancient Egyptian" humoresques printed on "mummy paper" - a predecessor of comics- which were produced from 1882 onwards, became well-known. During this period, he was in correspondence with the Egyptologist and writer Georg Ebers. He was further involved with texts and/or illustrations in the children's book Vom Storchennest bis zur Schule (1881), Kneipepistel § 11 (1881), Mein Buch (1884), Carmen Silva (commemorative sheets of the Queen of Romania), and Deutsche Märchen für Jugend und Volk (1887). For the KVM, he drew the portraits of his fellow painters, designed theatre posters for several Bummelstücke - in which he also acted himself - and wrote humorous poems.

In 1893, Seyppel exhibited six Parodies of a recent Norwegian exhibition in the Düsseldorf art shop of Eduard Schulte, in response to works exhibited by  Edvard Munch in Düsseldorf after their exhibition in Berlin was cancelled in 1892.

Seyppel was married to Helene, née Brunstering. They had five children. He was portrayed for the KVM Artists' Gallery by his son  .

Work 
 Düsseldorf, Kunstmuseum: Schwarzwälder Bauernstube. Interieur, oil painting (1900/03); Oberstraße in Enkrich
 Düsseldorf, Künstlerverein Malkasten, Archiv: Bildnis Köbes Schieve oil painting; Das Ständchen, Plakat (1875); 4 pencil drawings and a print for the Imperial Festival 1877; 1. Tenor von Düsseldorf, coloured drawing (1888); Mann mit Monokel, coloured caricature drawing (1889); Vizekönig Tuan Fang, Pencil drawing (1906).
 Düsseldorf, Stadtmuseum: Josef Schex im Alter von 58 Jahren, Pencil drawing (1877) and more artist caricatures; Der geheimnisvolle Unbekannt, poster (1878).
 Das neue Altargemälde (The new altarpiece) (Boetticher, No. 6: Mayor, parish council and priest of a village look at the new altarpiece in the town hall, which has just been delivered by the artist. Schultes Düsseldorf Art Exhibition 1874; Berlin, Academic Art Exhibition 1874; Munich, Annual Exhibition in the Glass Palace 1876); according to C. M. Seyppel (curriculum vitae, KVM) sold to the U.S.; as wood engraving in Daheim, Jg. 12 (Oct. 1875-Oct. 1876), No. 7, .
 Der Kouponschneider and Der Flickschneider, (Boetticher, no. 8: Berlin, akademische Kunstausstellung 1876; as woodcuts in: Daheim, Jg. 13 (1876/77), No. 33, .
 Abschiedstrunk (Farewell drink) in front of a house in the old town, woodcut in Illustrirte Welt, 36th Jg., 1888, .
 Bildnis eines Düsseldorfer Arztes (Portrait of a Düsseldorf doctor): Düsseldorfer Repräsentativ-Ausstellung, 1888/89 (Düsseldorfer Anzeiger, No. 10, 10 January 1889).
 Bildnis Karl Heintges (Portrait of Karl Heintges), 1888: Auktion Karbstein, Düsseldorf, 23 May 2009, no. 51.
 Die Klosterrumpelkammer (The Monastery rumple room) with many objects and cats, oil on canvas, 79 × 63 cm; signed Heintges.

Publications 
 Der Blick in's Jenseits : eine kitzliche Geschichte in 25 Bildern. - Düsseldorf : Sauernheimer, 1879. Numerizededition of the ULBD.
 Schlau, schläuer, am schläusten. - Düsseldorf : Bagel, 1882. Numerized edition of the ULBD.
 Er sie es (He she it): painted after nature and written down 1302 years before Christ's birth. - Dusseldorf : Bagel, 1883. Numerized edition of the ULBD
 Die Plagen (The plagues). - Dusseldorf : Bagel, 1884. Numerized edition of the ULBD
 Mein Buch (My book) with drawings on the sides by C. M. Seyppel. - Düsseldorf : Bagel, 1885. Numerized edition of the ULBD
 Roi, reine, prince : récit humoristique égyptien peint et écrit d'apres nature, l'an 1302 avant la naissance de J. C. - Düsseldorf : Bagel, 1886. Numerized edition of the ULBD.
 Schmidt und Smith in Lüderitzland : hottentottisches Blaubuch mit 118 Kritzeleien. - Düsseldorf : Bagel, 1887. Numerized edition of the ULBD.
 Rajadar und Hellmischu : altägypt. Gesang (Rajadar and Hellmishu : ancient Egyptian song). - Berlin : S. Fischer, 1889. Digitised edition of the ULBD.
 Berühmte Männer des vorigen Jahrhunderts : in chromo stampfo fresco scizo magnetischem Lichtdr (Famous men of the last century : in chromo ...). - Düsseldorf : Stümper, 1900. Numerized edition of the University and State Library Düsseldorf.

References

Further reading 
 Seyppel, Carl Maria. In Friedrich von Boetticher: Malerwerke des 19. Jahrhunderts. Beitrag zur Kunstgeschichte. Vol. 2/2, Bogen 33–67: Saal–Zwengauer. Fr. v. Boetticher’s Verlag, Dresden 1901,  (Textarchiv).
 Kunstchronik 9 (1874), 709; NF 4 (1893), ; 6 (1895), ; 25 (1914), ; 30 (1918/19), .
 Friedrich Schaarschmidt: Zur Geschichte der Düsseldorfer Kunst, insbesondere im XIX. Jahrhundert. Kunstverein für die Rheinlande und Westfalen, Düsseldorf 1902,  (short biography Karl Maria Seyppel ).
 Die Rheinlande 3 (1902/03), .
 Seyppel, Karl Maria. In Hans Wolfgang Singer (ed.): Allgemeines Künstler-Lexicon. Leben und Werke der berühmtesten bildenden Künstler. Vorbereitet von Hermann Alexander Müller. 5. unveränderte Auflage. Vol. 4: Raab–Vezzo. Literarische Anstalt, Rütten & Loening, Frankfurt 1921,  (Textarchiv – Internet Archive).
 Seyppel, Karl M. In Hans Wolfgang Singer (ed.): Allgemeines Künstler-Lexicon. Leben und Werke der berühmtesten bildenden Künstler. Vorbereitet von Hermann Alexander Müller. Vol. 6: Zweiter Nachtrag mit Berichtigungen. Literarische Anstalt, Rütten & Loening, Frankfurt, 1922, 4 (Textarchiv – Internet Archive).
 N.N.: Carl Maria Seyppel, der Düsseldorfer Karikaturist, in Unterhaltungsbeilage des Düsseldorfer Stadtanzeigers, Nr. 206, 28 July 1927 (9 Abb.).
 Paul Horn: Düsseldorfer Grafik in alter und neuer Zeit. Verlag des Kunstvereins für die Rheinlande und Westfalen. Düsseldorf 1928,  (2 Abb.).
 Seyppel, Carl Maria. In Hans Vollmer (ed.): Allgemeines Lexikon der Bildenden Künstler von der Antike bis zur Gegenwart. Created by Ulrich Thieme and Felix Becker. vol. 30: Scheffel–Siemerding. E. A. Seemann, Leipzig 1936, 
 Dictionnaire critique et documentaire des peintres, sculpteurs, dessinateurs et graveurs de tous les temps et de tous les pays vol. 9, Éditions Gründ, Paris 1976
 Düsseldorfer Heimatblätter Das Tor, 28. Jg., fascicule 3 March 1962, : Abb. Professor Läverwoosch,
Caricatures (1878).
 Joachim Hans Seyppel: Ahnengalerie. Geschichte einer deutschen Familie. A. Knaus, Munich 1984, .
 N.N.: Was jungen Malern beim Altbier alles einfällt, in Feinschmecker international, 1 June 1982, pp. 98 ff. (5 Abb.).
 Hans Ries, Illustrationen und Illustratoren 1871–1914. Das Bildangebot der Wilhelminischen Zeit. Geschichte und Asthetik der Original- und Drucktechniken. Internationales Lexikon der Illustratoren Bibliographie ihrer Arbeiten in deutschsprachigen Büchern und Zeitschriften, auf Bilderboth-gen und Wandtafeln. H. Th. Wenner, Osnabrück 1992. .
 Dieter Schwarz: Der Erfinder der Comics. Vor 108 Jahren schrieb C.arl Mari Seyppel Bildergeschichten auf „Mumienpapier“, in Das Düsseldorf Magazin 3/1990,  (3 Abb.).
 Sabine Schroyen: Quellen zur Geschichte des Künstlervereins Malkasten. Rheinland Verlag, Cologne 1992.
 Siegfried Weiß: Seypel, Karl (Carl) Maria, in Lexikon der Düsseldorfer Malerschule vol. 3. Bruckmann, Munich 1998,  (Abb.: Vor dem Bauernhaus, Beim Schachspiel (1888), Der Tanzgroschen (1878)).
 Dietrich Grünewald: Carl Maria Seyppel – der Malerhumorist, in Deutsche Comicforschung, vol. 4, Sackmann & Hörndl-Verlag, Hildesheim 200
 Auktion Lempertz, Cologne, 15 February 1909, Nr. 174; collection J. Bloos, Düsseldorf;
 Carl Maria Seyppel, In Friedrich von Boetticher: Malerwerke des 19. Jahrhunderts. Beitrag zur Kunstgeschichte. Vol 2/2, Bogen 33–67: Saal–Zwengauer. Fr. v. Boetticher’s Verlag, Dresden 1901, 4 (Textarchiv – Internet Archive). – Nr. 34 Rumpelkammer im Kloster

External links 

 

19th-century German painters
19th-century German male artists
German genre painters
German portrait painters
German caricaturists
19th-century German writers
1847 births
1913 deaths
Artists from Düsseldorf